The Government Polytechnic, Bhadrak is a State Government run diploma engineering school. It is established in 2017 by the Directorate of Technical Education & Training, Odisha (DTET).

Admissions 
Students can get admission to this institute by getting rank in Diploma Entrance Test organises every year by SCTE & VT. There is two categories available for admission. That are freshers entry after Matriculation(10th) & 20% seat are reserved for admission in two 2nd year or Third semester directly after ITI or +2 Science.

Courses

Diploma in Textile Engineering full-time 3 years	
Diploma in Mechanical Engineering full-time 3 years	
Diploma in Electrical Engineering full-time 3 years

Training and placement 
The institution runs all the training curriculum as per the norms of SCTE & VT & Govt. of Odisha. After successfully completing the course, students get placement by training and placement cell.

References

Engineering colleges in Odisha
Educational institutions established in 2017
2017 establishments in Odisha